The 1980 All-Ireland Senior Hurling Championship was the 94th staging of the All-Ireland Senior Hurling Championship, the Gaelic Athletic Association's premier inter-county hurling tournament. The draw for the 1980 fixtures took place in September 1979. The championship began on 25 May 1980 and ended on 7 September 1980.

Kilkenny were the defending champions but were defeated by Offaly in the Leinster final. Laois re-entered the Leinster Championship, having won the All-Ireland Senior B Hurling Championship the previous year.

On 7 September 1980, Galway won the championship following a 2–15 to 3–9 defeat of Limerick in the All-Ireland final. This was their second All-Ireland title, their first in fifty-seven championship seasons.

Limerick's Éamonn Cregan was the championship's top scorer with 5–18. Galway's Joe Connolly was the choice for Texaco Hurler of the Year.

Format

After a series of disappointing Munster finals in previous years, the Munster Council took the risk of a repetition and decided to stick with an open draw for the 1980 championship. Similarly, the Leinster Council decided to abandon their policy of seeding Kilkenny and Wexford on opposite sides of the draw in favour of an open draw.

Teams

Results

Leinster Senior Hurling Championship

Quarter-final

Semi-finals

Final

Munster Senior Hurling Championship

Quarter-final

Semi-finals

Final

All-Ireland Senior Hurling Championship

Quarter-final

Semi-final

Final

Championship statistics

Miscellaneous

 For the first time since 1969 the Leinster final sees a pairing other than Kilkenny and Wexford.
 The Leinster final sees Offaly defeat Kilkenny to take their very first provincial title.
 Limerick's victory in the Munster final foils Cork's hopes of an unprecedented sixth provincial title in-a-row.
 In the All-Ireland semi-final between Galway and Offaly the referee, J. J. Landers, signalled the end of the game with 52 seconds of normal time yet to be played and at least another half a minute of 'lost' time to be added on.  Offaly were in the middle of a comeback at that stage, after cutting Galway's lead from nine points to just two.  The game is also the first-ever championship meeting between these two sides.
 Galway's victory over Limerick in the championship decider is their first All-Ireland title since 1923.

Scoring statistics

Top scorers overall

Top scorers in a single game

Broadcasting

The following matches were broadcast live on television in Ireland on RTÉ.

Sources

 Corry, Eoghan, The GAA Book of Lists (Hodder Headline Ireland, 2005).
 Donegan, Des, The Complete Handbook of Gaelic Games (DBA Publications Limited, 2005).

References

1980
All-Ireland Senior Hurling Championship